Ora de știri ("The News Hour") is the main news show broadcasting daily on TVR2 starting at 6pm. It is presented by Stela Popa and Teodora Antonescu.

In 2016, Ora de știri was moved to TVR 1's broadcasting schedule. However, the program last aired in March 2018, and Ora de știri got removed from TVR 1's broadcasting schedule. It was replaced by documentaries.

On 4 October 2021, Ora de știri revived as TVR2's news program.

Ora de știri adopted a new look on 22 June 2022, at the same time when TVR Info was launched.

Romanian television news shows
2000s Romanian television series
2006 Romanian television series debuts
2018 television series endings
2021 Romanian television series debuts
TVR (TV network) original programming